Bradespar is a Brazilian holding company headquartered in São Paulo. The company was formed in 2000 by Banco Bradesco in order to allow the bank to spin off some of its industrial investments. In 2005, the company began to hold large holdings in mining company Vale and utility company CPFL Energia, which is one of the largest companies in the Brazilian electric sector. Bradespar's stock is traded in São Paulo and Madrid stock exchanges, and it is part of the São Paulo's Ibovespa index. Currently, the single investment of the company is in  the mining multinational company Vale, being one of the largest shareholders.

References

External links 
 The company's home page in Portuguese and English

Financial services companies established in 2000
Companies listed on B3 (stock exchange)
Companies based in São Paulo
Holding companies of Brazil
Companies listed on the Madrid Stock Exchange
Holding companies established in 2000
Brazilian companies established in 2000